George Alfred Sawin (October 1878 – November 29, 1961) was an American football player and electrical engineer. A native of Massachusetts, Sawin attended Harvard College where he played at the halfback position for the Harvard Crimson football team in 1899 and 1900.  He was selected as a first-team All-American in 1899 by both the New York Tribune and the New York Sun. In 1900, he was named a second-team All-American by both Walter Camp and Caspar Whitney. He later worked as an electrical engineer and lived in Scarsdale, New York. He died at his home in Scarsdale in 1961 at age 83.

References

External links

1878 births
1961 deaths
Harvard Crimson football players
American football halfbacks
Players of American football from Massachusetts